Peter Paterson may refer to:

Peter Paterson (footballer, born 1880) (1880–?), Scottish footballer for Everton and Grimsby Town
Peter Paterson (footballer, born 1916) (1916–1968), Australian rules footballer for Essendon
Peter Paterson (artist), see The Rebel Angels
Peter Paterson (journalist), see The Second Coming

See also
 Peter Patterson (disambiguation)